Kemal Curić (born February 17, 1978) is a Bosnian-German automobile designer born in Sarajevo. Curić is known best for his work at Ford, where he was responsible for numerous concept and production cars.

Biography
Curić was born in Sarajevo, Bosnia and Herzegovina, due to war in Bosnia and Herzegovina, he moved to Dortmund, Germany in 1995. He graduated in Industrial design at Wuppertall University in 2003 and started to work for Ford in 2004, at first as an interior designer and from 2006 as an exterior designer on the 2011 Ford Focus program. Curić won an Interior Motives design award for student work in 2005. In 2009 and 2010 he was a guest speaker at the Automotive Design Conference in Zagreb. Upon his design proposal winning an internal design competition for the S550 Mustang program in December 2010, in January 2011 he moved to Ford North America in Dearborn and became lead exterior designer for the Ford Mustang. After production body design approval on the S550 Mustang in December 2012, he assumed the position Mustang Design Manager in January 2013.

Most important projects

Ford Mustang (S550), exterior, (2012)
Ford Vertrek, concept, exterior (2010)
Ford Fusion/Mondeo, exterior (2010)
Ford Escape/Kuga (MK II) (2009) 
Ford Focus (MK III) Station Wagon, exterior (2009)
Ford Focus (MK III) 5dr, exterior (2008)
Ford Kuga, exterior (2007)
Ford Iosis X, concept, interior (2006)
Ford Iosis concept, interior (2005)
Ford KA (MK II), interior (2004)
Ford Fiesta, interior (2004)

References

1978 births
Living people
People from Sarajevo
Ford designers